Abdelrahman Yehia Abdelhaleem (born June 29, 1996) is a Qatari professional basketball player.  He currently plays for Al-Wakrah of the Qatari Basketball League and the FIBA Asia Champions Cup.

He represented Qatar's national basketball team at the 2016 FIBA Asia Challenge in Tehran, Iran. There, he recorded most blocks for his team.

References

External links
 Asia-basket.com Profile
 2016 FIBA Asia Challenge Profile
 2015 FIBA Asia Championship Profile

1996 births
Living people
Forwards (basketball)
People from Doha
Qatari men's basketball players
Basketball players at the 2018 Asian Games
Asian Games competitors for Qatar